The 1931 Spanish local elections were held on 12 April throughout all Spain municipalities to elect 80,472 councillors.
These elections were perceived as a plebiscite on the monarchy of Alfonso XIII. The Second Spanish Republic was proclaimed after this election.

Background 
Since 1923, Spain had been a dictatorship with the approval of the reigning monarch at the time: Alfonso XIII. After the end of the Primo de Rivera dictatorship in 1930 and the failure of his successor to establish another dictatorship, in 1931 the new cabinet appointed by the king decided to hold new local elections for first time in nine years.
Although they were local elections, they were perceived as a plebiscite on the Spanish monarchy.

Electoral system
The number of seats of each council was determined by the population count. According to the 1877 municipal law, the population-seat relationship on each municipality was to be established on the following scale:

The 1907 election law established that councillors should be elected in districts consisting of 4 members, although 3 to 7 member districts were also allowed. Voters had to choose multiple candidates using limited voting, which allows a voter to vote for fewer candidates than members have to be elected. Candidates winning a plurality of votes in each district were elected. If the number of candidates was equal or fewer than the number of seats to be filled, candidates were automatically proclaimed without an election.
Voting was compulsory and on the basis of universal manhood suffrage, with males over twenty-five and at least a two-year residency in a municipality required to vote.
Mayors were elected indirectly by the city or town council on the first session after the election.

Results

Overall results 

The results shown were extracted from the 1931 Spanish Statistical Annuary. 

Results show a win of the Republicans by a large margin in Asturias, Aragon and Catalonia. Monarchists got their best results in the Balearic Islands, Andalusia and Extremadura.

The republicans had a majority in more than four-fifths of the provincial capitals. In the city of Barcelona, the largest city by that time, they achieved more than the 75% of the seats.

These were the results in the province capitals plus Ceuta and Melilla:

Catalonia 

The results showed very favourable results for the republicans in Catalonia. They won every major city (cities over 10,000 and capitals of judicial districts) except for Igualada. In Berga, where they got tied with the monarchists in number of seats.

In the most important cities, the results were as follows:

Aftermath 
On 14 April, two days after the election, in the cities where the republicans won the election, large crowds of people celebrated the victory on the streets. In Eibar, Barcelona, Valencia, Madrid and other cities the Second Spanish Republic was proclaimed. Eibar was the first city to fly the Spanish tricolor.

Alfonso XIII left Spain and exiled to Rome, without abdicating. A provisional government was formed and two months later general elections were called.

References 

Municipal elections in Spain
1931 elections in Spain